Heavy Load may refer to:

Music
 Heavy Load (album), 1993 album by New Kingdom 
 Heavy Load (band), a Swedish heavy metal band
 Heavy Load (punk band), a British punk band composed of members suffering from various disabilities
 Heavy Load (film), a British documentary about the punk band Heavy Load
 "Heavy Load", a song by Free from the album Fire and Water

Other uses
 Heavy Load (Transformers), several fictional characters in the Transformers universes

See also
 Load (disambiguation)
 Overloading (disambiguation)
 Haulage
 Freight